Albert J. Merkovsky (1917-1982) was a professional football player in the National Football League. He played in the league from 1944 to 1945. He played for the Pittsburgh Steelers and "Card-Pitt", a team that was the result of a temporary merger between the Chicago Cardinals and the Steelers. The teams' merger was a result of the manning shortages experienced league-wide due to World War II.

Prior to his professional career, Merkovsky played college football at the University of Pittsburgh. In 1939, he played in three college football All-Star Games, located in Boston, Providence and New York.

References

1917 births
1982 deaths
People from North Braddock, Pennsylvania
Players of American football from Pennsylvania
Pittsburgh Steelers players
Card-Pitt players
Pittsburgh Panthers football players